The Council of Nationalist-Religious Activists of Iran or The Coalition of National-Religious Forces of Iran is an Iranian political group, described as "nonviolent, religious semi-opposition" with a following of mainly middle class, intellectual, representatives of technical professions, students and technocrats.

Platform 
The group shares the Freedom Movement of Iran's pro-democracy stance but favors welfare-state economics, instead of a free-market model, and holds a more critical view toward the West in their foreign policy.

According to Human Rights Watch, it is a "loosely knit group of activists who favor political reform and who advocate the implementation of constitutional provisions to uphold the rule of law. The grouping, which has no formal structure, came together to contest the parliamentary elections of 2000". It is also described as "a collection of liberals and social democrats with active Islamic feminists among its members".

According to Taghi Rahmani, the group "believes that religion should serve civil society. It also believes that all Iranians have equal rights, and that they should be seen as equal citizens despite their different viewpoints."

Electoral history

See also 
 Front for Democracy and Human Rights

References

External links
Unofficial website, associated with the alliance

2000 establishments in Iran
Banned political parties in Iran
Electoral lists for Iranian legislative election, 2000
Islamic democratic political parties
Islamic political parties in Iran
Political parties established in 2000